Lewis Glacier is in the U.S. state of Oregon. The glacier is situated in the Cascade Range at an elevation generally above . Lewis Glacier is on the southeast slopes of South Sister, an inactive stratovolcano.

See also
 List of glaciers in the United States

References

Glaciers of Oregon
Glaciers of Deschutes County, Oregon